Bayonne, New Jersey was incorporated on April 1, 1861 as a township. It was reincorporated on March 10, 1869 as a city. It is currently governed within the Faulkner Act, formally known as the Optional Municipal Charter Law, under the Mayor-Council system of municipal government (Plan C), implemented based on the recommendations of a Charter Study Commission as of July 1, 1962, before which it was governed by a Board of Commissioners under the Walsh Act. The governing body consists of a mayor and a five-member city council, of which two seats are elected at-large and three from wards. This is a list of mayors of Bayonne, New Jersey.

Mayors

References

 
Bayonne